Rubus floribundus is a South American species of brambles in the rose family. It grows in western South America as far south as Bolivia.

Rubus floribundus is a perennial with soft wool and a few curved prickles. Leaves are compound with 3 or 5 stiff leaflets. Flowers are white. Fruits are purple.

References

floribundus
Flora of South America
Plants described in 1824